Migdal Insurance and Financial Holdings Ltd. is an Israeli insurance company.

History
Migdal was founded in Jerusalem in 1934. The original group of investors included local Palestinian Jews, families from Egypt and Italy and the Italian insurance company  Assicurazioni Generali which held a 50% stake and provided the original financial and professional backing.

Generali eventually held 70% of Migdal's shares, and Bank Leumi owns almost 10%.

In September 1996, Migdal made its initial public offering on the Tel Aviv Stock Exchange, selling 20% shares stake.

In March 2012 Assicurazioni Generali sold Migdal to Shlomo Eliahu.

See also
Economy of Israel

References

External links
  website

Companies listed on the Tel Aviv Stock Exchange
Insurance companies of Israel
Financial services companies established in 1934
1934 establishments in Mandatory Palestine